Hannington may refer to:

Places in England
Hannington, Hampshire
Hannington, Northamptonshire
Hannington, Wiltshire

People
James Hannington (1847–1885), English bishop of Eastern Equatorial Africa
Henry Hannington (1797–1870), English cricketer
Wal Hannington (1896–1966), British Communist
William Hannington (by 1530–1607), English politician

Other uses
Hanningtons, former department store, Brighton, England

See also
Hanington (disambiguation)